Dendrobium capra is a species of orchid endemic to the Island of Java in Indonesia.

References

capra
Orchids of Java
Endemic orchids of Indonesia
Plants described in 1910